Lawrence of Newark is a jazz album by organist/keyboardist Larry Young, released on the Perception Records label.

The album is Young's debut for Perception Records which has since been reissued on CD by Castle Records.  Perception Records went out of business shortly after the release of this recording, so it has never been widely available, and hence rarely heard in the 70s and 80s.

Lawrence of Newark represents Larry Young's first non-Blue Note recording as a leader post-Lifetime and is startling for its fresh look at how the organ is used in jazz and in improvisation.

Reception
The Allmusic review by Thom Jurek stated: "The CD reissue has fine sound ... it should not be overlooked. The DJs just haven't discovered this one yet. Awesome."

Track listing
All tracks composed by Larry Young
 "Sunshine Fly Away" - 8:38
 "Khalid of Space, Pt. 2: Welcome" - 12:29
 "Saudia" - 4:30
 "Alive" - 1:54
 "Hello Your Quietness (Islands)" - 10:05

Personnel
Juini Booth - bass
Stacey Edwards - conga, percussion
James Flores - drums
Art Gore - drums, electric piano
Abdul Hakim - bongos, percussion
Armen Halburian - bells, conga, percussion
Diedre Johnson - cello
Howard King - drums
Poppy LaBoy - percussion
Cedric Lawson - electric piano
Charles Magee - electric trumpet, trumpet
Dennis Mourouse - electric saxophone, tenor saxophone
Umar Abdul Muizz - conga, percussion
Don Pate - bass
Abdul Sahid - drums
Pharoah Sanders - tenor saxophone
Jumma Santos - conga, cowbell, hi-hat, percussion, tambourine, tom-tom, whistling
James Blood Ulmer - guitar
Larry Young - bongos, keyboards, organ, percussion, producer, remixing, vocals

References

External links 
Lawrence Young at All Music Guide.

Larry Young (musician) albums
1973 albums
Perception Records albums